Louis Alexandre Laufray (1 October 1881 – 4 February 1970) was a French freestyle swimmer. He competed in the men's 4000 metre freestyle event and the water polo at the 1900 Summer Olympics, winning a bronze medal in the latter.

See also
 List of Olympic medalists in water polo (men)

References

External links
 

1881 births
1970 deaths
French male water polo players
Olympic swimmers of France
Olympic water polo players of France
Swimmers at the 1900 Summer Olympics
Water polo players at the 1900 Summer Olympics
Olympic bronze medalists for France
Olympic medalists in water polo
Medalists at the 1900 Summer Olympics
Swimmers from Paris
French male freestyle swimmers
19th-century French people
20th-century French people
French male long-distance swimmers